

Winners and nominees

1980s

1990s

2000s

2010s

2020s

Records 
 Most awarded actor: Enrique Rocha, 4 times.
 Most nominated actors: Enrique Rocha and Alejandro Camacho with 6 nominations.
 Most nominated actor (never winner): Alexis Ayala with 4 nominations.
 Actors have won all nominations: Sebastián Ligarde and Juan Carlos Barreto, 2 times. Alejandro Nones and Rodrigo Murray, 1 time.
 Youngest winner: Danilo Carrera, 29 years old.
 Youngest nominee: Jose Elias Moreno, 28 years old.
 Oldest winner: Manuel Ojeda, 73 years old.
 Oldest nominee: Miguel Manzano, 77 years old.
 Actors winning after short time: Enrique Rocha by (Pasión y poder, 1989) and (Yo compro esa mujer, 1991), 2 years difference.
 Actors winning after long time: Manuel Ojeda by (Laberintos de pasión, 2000) and (La Tempestad, 2014), 14 years difference.
 Actors that winning the award for the same role: Enrique Rocha (Pasión y poder, 1989), César Évora (Mundo de fieras, 2006) and Fernando Colunga (Pasión y poder, 2016)
Actors nominated for the same role without winning:
Alejandro Camacho (Muchachitas, 1992) and Fabián Robles (Muchachitas como tú, 2008)
Marco Muñoz (Valeria y Maximiliano, 1993) and Sergio Sendel (Heridas de amor, 2007)
Foreign winning actors:
 Roberto Ballesteros from Peru
 César Évora from Cuba
 Marcelo Córdoba from Argentina
 Danilo Carrera from Ecuador
 Alejandro Nones from Venezuela

References

External links 
TVyNovelas at esmas.com
TVyNovelas Awards at the univision.com

Antagonist